Harold Joseph Morowitz (December 4, 1927 – March 22, 2016) was an American biophysicist who studied the application of thermodynamics to living systems. Author of numerous books and articles, his work includes technical monographs as well as essays. The origin of life was his primary research interest for more than fifty years. He was the Robinson Professor of Biology and Natural Philosophy at George Mason University after a long career at Yale.

Life and career
Morowitz was born in Poughkeepsie, New York. He received a B.S. in physics and philosophy in 1947, an M.S. in physics in 1950, and a Ph.D. in biophysics in 1951, all from Yale University. Morowitz was a professor in the department of molecular biophysics and biochemistry at Yale from 1955 to 1987, also serving as the Master of Pierson College from 1981 to 1986. He spent the rest of his career on the faculty at George Mason University, which he joined in 1988 as Clarence Robinson Professor of biology and natural philosophy. He served as the founding director of the Krasnow Institute for Advanced Study at George Mason from 1993 to 1998. Morowitz was closely associated with the Santa Fe Institute since 1987, where he was Chairman Emeritus of the Science Board. He also served as the founding editor of the journal Complexity. In the 1990s he contributed a monthly column on science and society to Hospital Practice.

Morowitz was a longtime consultant for NASA, and served on the committees that planned the quarantine procedures for Apollo 11 and the biology experiments the Viking probe carried to the surface of Mars. He was a member of the science advisory committee for Biosphere 2 in Oracle, Arizona, which, at 3.14 acres, is the largest enclosed ecosystem ever built.

Some leading biophysicists have suggested that Morowitz may have discovered a "fourth law of thermodynamics" when, in 1968, he found that, "in steady state systems, the flow of energy through the system from a source to a sink will lead to at least one cycle in the system." Eric D. Schneider, for example, says, "Morowitz's cycling theorem is the best candidate for a fourth law of thermodynamics."

The origin of life
Morowitz's book Energy Flow in Biology laid out his central thesis that "the energy that flows through a system acts to organize that system," an insight later quoted on the inside front cover of The Last Whole Earth Catalog. He was a vigorous proponent of the view that life on earth emerged deterministically from the laws of chemistry and physics, and so believed it highly probable that life exists widely in the universe.

In 1981, he testified at "McLean v. Arkansas" (nicknamed "Scopes II") that creationism has no scientific basis and so should not be taught as science in public schools.

His work is sometimes associated with the Gard model of evolutionary biology

Testimony in McLean v. Arkansas trial

The McLean v Arkansas trial, held in the Federal District Court in Little Rock, Arkansas, dealt with “Balanced Treatment of Creation Science and Evolution Science in the Public Schools” and was of considerable interest at the time.  Morowitz described his testimony on this occasion in an essay  “Tell it to the Judge” published in a somewhat whimsical collection of essays entitled “Mayonnaise and the Origin of Life”.  Morowitz’s testimony was related to the aspect of the case dealing with abiogenesis, “the emergence of life from nonlife.”  In support of creationism, the argument had been made that the second law of thermodynamics precludes that abiogenesis could have occurred by a natural process; thus there was a requirement for supernatural events. According to the second law, isolated systems move towards the maximum degree of molecular disorder (life on earth is an ordered system).  Also in this case, “isolated system” means the absence of flows of both energy and matter into and out of the system.

Much of Morowitz’s scientific career had been devoted to understanding the thermodynamic foundations of biological organization.  When he was called to give his expert testimony he noted that Ludwig Boltzmann, the distinguished Austrian physicist had in 1886 resolved the confusion concerning the applicability of the second law of thermodynamics to living systems.  Boltzmann had made clear that the Earth, rather than being an isolated system, is an open system undergoing a flow of solar energy from the sun. Thus the surface of the Earth is not limited by a law that is restricted to isolated entities.  Morowitz also pointed out that newer developments in the field of irreversible thermodynamics (see Irreversible Process and Lars Onsager), indicated that systems become ordered under a flow of energy.  In his testimony Morowitz concluded that the existence of life involves no contradictions to the laws of physics.

Publications
Proceedings of the First National Biophysics Conference. Yale University Press, 1959, Morowitz, H.J. and Quastler, H., Editors.
Life and the Physical Sciences: Introduction to Biophysics. HoltRinehart and Winston, Inc., 1963, Morowitz, H.J.
Theoretical and Mathematical Biology. Blaisdell Publishing Co., 1965, Waterman, T. and Morowitz, H., Editors.
Energy Flow in Biology. Academic Press, 1968, Morowitz, Harold J.
Entropy for Biologists. Academic Press, 1970, Morowitz, Harold J.
Life on the Planet Earth. W. W. Norton & Co., 1974, Morowitz, H.J. and Morowitz, L.S.
Ego Niches: An Ecological View of Organizational Behavior. Ox Bow Press, 1977, Morowitz, Harold J.
Foundations of Bioenergetics. Academic Press, 1978, Morowitz, Harold J.
The Wine of Life & Other Essays on Societies, Energy, & Living Things. St. Martin's Press, 1979, Morowitz, Harold J.
Mayonnaise and The Origin of Life: Thoughts of Minds and Molecules. Charles Scribner's Sons, 1985, Morowitz, Harold J.
Models for Biomedical Research: A New Perspective. National Academy Press, 1985, Committee on Models for Biomedical Research, Harold J. Morowitz, Chairman.
Cosmic Joy and Local Pain: Musings of a Mystical Scientist. Charles Scribner's Sons, 1987, Morowitz, Harold J.
The Thermodynamics of Pizza. Rutgers University Press, 1991, Morowitz, Harold J.
The Facts of Life. Oxford University Press, 1992, Morowitz, Harold J. and Trefil, James.
Beginnings of Cellular Life: Metabolism Recapitulates Biogenesis. Yale University Press, 1992, Morowitz, Harold J.
Entropy and the Magic Flute. Oxford University Press, 1993, Morowitz, Harold J.
The Kindly Dr. Guillotine. Counterpoint, 1997, Morowitz, Harold J.
The Emergence of Everything. Oxford University Press, 2002, Morowitz, Harold J.
The Origin and Nature of Life on Earth: The Emergence of the Fourth Geosphere. Cambridge University Press, 2016, Smith, Eric and Morowitz, Harold J.

References

External links 

Harold Morowitz Papers 1944-2016

1927 births
2016 deaths
American biophysicists
George Mason University faculty
Origin of life
People from Poughkeepsie, New York
Yale University alumni
Yale University faculty
Santa Fe Institute people
Scientists from New York (state)